The Mexico City megalopolis, also known as the Megalopolis of Central Mexico, is a megalopolis containing Greater Mexico City and surrounding metropolitan areas.

In 1996, the  first proposed the concept of a "Megalopolis of Central Mexico", which was later expanded by PROAIRE, a metropolitan commission on the environment. 

The Megalopolis of Central Mexico includes 10 metropolitan areas of Mexico, as defined by the National Population Council (CONAPO): Valley of Mexico, Puebla, Toluca, Cuernavaca, Pachuca, Tlaxcala–Apizaco, Cuautla, Tulancingo, Tula and Tianguistenco. Some of these areas form complex subregional rings themselves (i.e. Puebla forming a regional ring with Atlixco, San Martín Texmelucan, Tlaxcala and Apizaco). 

Its population as of 2020 is 30.8 million people, about 25% of the country's total.

Some sources include Greater Querétaro in this megalopolis, with a population of over a million. Querétaro is also part of the fast-growing macroregion of Bajío.

Component metropolitan areas

References

Metropolitan areas of Mexico